Marija Bistrica is a village and municipality in the Krapina-Zagorje County in central Croatia, located on the slopes of the Medvednica mountain in the Hrvatsko Zagorje region north of the capital Zagreb. The municipality has 5,976 inhabitants, with 1,071 residents in the settlement itself (2011 census).

Marija Bistrica has an old Marian shrine of the Black Madonna which is a place of pilgrimage and visited by hundreds of thousands of pilgrims every year.
On 3 October 1998, Pope John Paul II visited Marija Bistrica and beatified Croatian Cardinal Aloysius Stepinac in front of a crowd of 500,000 Croatians.

History
The first written mention of the settlement Bistrica dates back to 1209 AD, as the possession of Croatian-Hungarian king Andrew II. Documents from 1334 first mention the church of Saints Peter and Paul.

Shrine

In 1545 a local priest hid the wonder working statue of the Blessed Virgin Mary with the Infant Jesus, which previously stood in a wooden chapel on the Vinski Vrh (Hill) nearby, within the church to save it from the Turks and took the secret of its hiding place to his grave. The statue was discovered in 1588, when according to the records bright light shone from the place where it was buried. In 1650 the statue had to be once again hidden to be rediscovered in 1684.

In 1710 the Croatian parliament vowed to fund a new altar in the church, which was done in 1715. In 1731 the church was expanded and reconsecrated to Our Lady of the Snows. In 1750 Pope Benedict XIV granted plenary indulgence to pilgrims who confess and accept the Eucharist in Bistrica. From 1879 to 1882 a new church was built in its place, designed in the style of Neo-Renaissance by Hermann Bollé. Arcades were constructed around the church decorated with 22 paintings of the miracles granted by the Blessed Virgin. During the construction a fire destroyed all of the church except the statue and the main altar. In 1923 Pope Pius XI granted the church the status of a minor basilica and in 1935 the archbishop of Zagreb Ante Bauer crowned the statue as Our Lady Queen of Croatia. As archbishop, Aloysius Stepinac paid special attention to the site and made annual pilgrimages. On 8 July 1945 he led his last pilgrimage to Marija Bistrica which drew 40,000-50,000 people.

Municipality

The municipality consists of the following settlements:
 Globočec, population 525
 Hum Bistrički, pop. 441
 Laz Bistrički, pop. 788
 Laz Stubički, pop. 267
 Marija Bistrica, pop. 1,071
 Podgorje Bistričko, pop. 904
 Podgrađe, pop. 321
 Poljanica Bistrička, pop. 347
 Selnica, pop. 653
 Sušobreg Bistrički, pop. 81
 Tugonica, pop. 578

Gallery

References

External links 

 
 Website of the Shrine 
  Short info

Shrines to the Virgin Mary
Religious buildings and structures in Croatia
Catholic Church in Croatia
Municipalities of Croatia
Populated places in Krapina-Zagorje County
Roman Catholic shrines in Croatia